Portal R2E CCMC was a portable microcomputer designed and marketed by the studies and developments department of the French firm R2E Micral and officially appeared in September 1980 at the Sicob show in Paris. The Osborne 1 was released eight months later, in April 1981. specializing in payroll and accounting.

Several hundred examples were sold between 1980 and 1983.

Extremely rare, no museum has a Portal; two are in private collections.

The company R2E Micral is also known to have designed "the earliest commercial, non-kit computer based on a microprocessor", the Micral N, one of the last examples of which was sold for 62,000 euros to Paul G. Allen, the co-founder of Microsoft (with Bill Gates), by the auctioneer Rouillac on June 11, 2017, for Allen's Seattle museum, Living Computer Museum + Labs.

Specifications 

It provided total mobility.

See also 
 R2E Micral
 Laptop#History

References

Bibliography 
François Gernelle, Portal designer

Sources 
This article is partially derived from the page of old-computers.com and feb-patrimoine.com.

Portable computers
Products introduced in 1980
Computer-related introductions in 1980
French inventions
History of computing in France
Information technology in France
1980 establishments in France
1983 disestablishments in France